Brickellia coixtlahuaca is a Mexican species of flowering plant in the family Asteraceae. It is native to the State of Oaxaca in southwestern Mexico.

References

coixtlahuaca
Flora of Oaxaca
Plants described in 2010